The Sport Jiu-Jitsu International Federation is one of the international governing bodies for the sport of Brazilian jiu-jitsu, which is  also known as BJJ.

History

The Jiu-Jitsu Federation of Guanabara, in Rio de Janeiro, was founded on April 25 1967. The federation was established under the authorization of the National Sports Confederation of that country. The federation was founded by five founding schools and it was articulated by Hélio Gracie, Alvaro Barreto, Joao Alberto Barreto, Hélcio Leal Binda and Oswaldo Fadda.

The president of the Federation was Helio Gracie, and the Chairman of the Advisory Council was Carlos Gracie. His firstborn, Carlson Gracie, was the director of the technical department. The first vice technician was Fadda and the second, Orlando Barradas - both Jiu-Jitsu Professors. Joao Alberto Barreto, outstanding student of the Gracie’s, was appointed director of the education department, which had as deputy director Robson Gracie – all now known as great masters of the art.

The Jiu-Jitsu Federation of Guanabara  was chaired by Hélio Gracie and had sport bases, regulations, etc. The foundation of the Federation was the first step to make Brazilian jiu-jitsu a sport and not a street fighting art. The art of jiu-jitsu began to have structure and organization. The orders of graduation tracks were regulated: white, blue, purple, brown and black. The yellow bands, orange and green, were granted only for children. If the practitioner was greater than 16 years, they would directly be promoted from white to blue. In addition, the rules for any championships organized by them were regulated. In the rules, maneuvers like take-downs, mount with both knees on the floor or back with hooks awarded the competitor points. The duration of the contest in the adult category was five minutes with extension of three. Jiu-Jitsu officially earned time and scores.

In June 1973, Jiu Jitsu was finally legally recognized as a sport in Brazil and in December 1973, the Federation Jiu-Jitsu Guanabara organized their first championship the “1º Torneio Oficial de Jiu-Jítsu do Brasil” hosted in Rio de Janeiro, at the Athletic Association Bank of Brazil beginning a new era for Jiu-Jitsu as a sport.

After the implementation of Jiu-Jitsu as a sport, it had fast growth throughout Brazil and in 1980 Jiu-Jitsu began to develop internationally.  Due to all founders, professors, representatives and participants at that time being Brazilians the name Brazilian Jiu-jitsu was acquired for this art.  With the increase of Brazilian Jiu Jitsu many academies, teams, events, tournaments, and federations have been created to improve the sport, yet at the same time resulting in some politics between teams and federations that have delayed the prosperity and development of the sport.

By 2011, Jiu-Jitsu or Brazilian Jiu-Jitsu was a sport practiced and recognized worldwide, but it did not have an established federation that met the IOC requirements and/or that was recognized as a single international governing body for the sport.  With this in mind and main motivating factor a group of Jiu-Jitsu professors and tournament organizers thought that it was time to invest and dedicate themselves in the growth of the sport.

Thus, in June 2011 the Sport Jiu-Jitsu International Federation or SJJIF was founded by professors Joao Silva, Patricia Silva, Samuel Aschidamini, Cleiber Maia, Edison Kagohara, and Marcello Rosa.   SJJIF hosted its first international event, the SJJIF Worlds, on December 14 and 15 of 2013 at the Long Beach Pyramid in Long Beach, California USA.  They believed that by creating this federation it would benefit and enable positive growth of the sport, organize it, and meet the IOC requirements with easier rules and better understanding of the sport by both practitioners and non-practitioners. This federation would also help the growth of the sport by tracking the number of existing participants in the sport and ranking them by their performance in sanctioned events. Last but not least, create community events to promote, teach, and educate all practitioners and non practitioners on this great sport.

The SJJIF has grown tremendously since its founding and it has already had sanctioned events and federations in North America, South America, Asia, Europe, Africa and Oceania.

References
 Site oficial SJJIF
 SJJIF Tournaments
 SJJIF Rules
 SJJIF Rulebook

External links
 Official SJJIF YouTube channel

Brazilian jiu-jitsu organizations